To reduce dependence on jute imports, the Government of Pakistan has given priority for establishing jute industry in Pakistan. Between 1964 and 1971, four jute mills were established in Pakistan with the small production capacity to meet the domestic demand of jute products. This is how the Jute Mills Association (PJMA) established.

History of Jute Mills 
In 1970, jute industry was established. Pakistan Industrial Development Corporation (PIDC) launched the initiative to provide packaging material to government agencies for food grains storage.  The jute industry is dependent on raw jute imports from Bangladesh. The jute mills are fully equipped with the spinning, weaving and finishing facilities for the production of hessian cloth and jute sacks. The government agencies, public sector corporations and farmers are the lead buyers of the jute products. Usually, jute sacks is being utilized to procure food grains [sugar, wheat etc.] for long term. Other major commodities which are procured in jute sacks are rice, coffee, pulses, ripe seed, cotton seed etc. The Jute Industry in Pakistan has over 30,000 of workforce and fully equipped to meet the demand of the country. Currently, the mills [members of the association] is exporting products globally especially to Sudan, UK, UAE, Iran, Egypt, Thailand and many other countries globally.

Governance 
Election Results for the Office bearers/Executive Committee members of Pakistan Jute Mills Association for the year 2012–13, Malik Mohammad Jehangir, Executive Director of Indus Jute Mills Limited,  Dhabeji, Karachi and White Pearl Jute Mills Limited, Hafizabad.

Successes 
Pakistan Jute Mills Association (PJMA) on regular basis make people aware that jute bag is environment friendly packing [hundred percent biodegradable and recyclable] for the agriculture commodities [especially grains] and the use of woven polypropylene bag is unfavorable for environment and ecology.

To meet the requirement of the jute mills Pakistan needs only 150,000 acres. Due to the government's decision to use polypropylene bags for procurement has resulted in the closure of five mills out of twelve jute mills of Pakistan. The leading members of PJMA and leading mills are Indus Jute Mills Limited, Dhabeji, Karachi and White Pearl Jute Mills Limited, Hafizabad, Punjab. PJMA launched initiative to convince farmers to sow jute to meet the demand and also to save $100 million annually on import. The association extended full support to the farmers (from plantation to marketing). PJMA also assured farmers regarding free seed provision and promised to provide them guidance. The association also assured farmers buying the whole produce at a better price compared to cotton.

External links
Pakistan Jute Mills Association

References

Business organisations based in Pakistan
Agricultural organisations based in Pakistan
Jute industry